Gandhara Nellore Assembly constituency is a SC (Scheduled Caste) reserved constituency of Andhra Pradesh Legislative Assembly, India. It is one among 7 constituencies in Chittoor district.

K. Narayana Swamy of YSR Congress Party is currently representing the constituency.

Mandals

Members of Legislative Assembly Gangadhara Nellore

Assembly elections 2014

Assembly elections 2019

 

Source: Constituency results

See also
 List of constituencies of Andhra Pradesh Vidhan Sabha

References

Assembly constituencies of Andhra Pradesh